The Beyhan II Dam is a planned gravity dam on the Murat River near the village of Beyhan in Palu district, Elazığ Province, Turkey. It is owned by Kalehan Energy Generation.

See also
Beyhan I Dam – upstream

References

Dams in Elazığ Province
Gravity dams
Dams on the Murat River